Culley is a surname. Notable people with the name include:

Bill Culley (1892–1955), Scottish footballer
Charles Culley CMG (1877–1949), Australian politician
David Culley (born 1955), American football coach
Fiona Culley, British country singer-songwriter
Frank Culley (1917–1991), American saxophonist and bandleader
Frederick Culley (1879–1942), British film actor
George Culley (died 1813), English agriculturist
Henry Culley, American tennis player
Julie Culley (born 1981), American track and field athlete
Karl Culley, English guitarist and singer-songwriter
Peter Culley (1958 – 2015), Canadian poet 
Thea Culley (born 1986),  Canadian field hockey player
Wendell Culley (1906–1983), American jazz trumpeter

See also
 Culley (given name)